Miyuki-bashi is a Hiroden station tram stop on Hiroden Ujina Line located in Senda-machi 3-chome, Naka-ku, Hiroshima.

Routes
From Miyuki-bashi Station, there are two of Hiroden Streetcar routes.

 Hiroshima Station - Hiroshima Port Route
 Hiroden-nishi-hiroshima - Hiroshima Port Route

Connections
█ Ujina Line
 
Hiroden-honsha-mae — Miyuki-bashi — Minami-machi 6-chome

Other services connections

Hiroden Bus services routes
Route #12 at "Miyuki-bashi" bus stop

Hiroshima Bus services routes
Route #21-1 and #50 at "Miyuki-bashi" bus stop
Route #50 at "Shudo-gakuen-mae" bus stop

Around station
Miyuki-bashi (Miyuki bridge)
Shudo Junior High School, Shudo High School
Hiroshima Beauty College
Hiroshima Naka-ku sports center

History
Opened on November 23, 1912.
Closed from June 10, 1944 to August 16, 1945.
Reopened on August 17, 1945.

See also
Hiroden Streetcar Lines and Routes

References 

Miyuki-bashi Station
Railway stations in Japan opened in 1912